Sonic the Hedgehog is a media franchise created by Sega.

Sonic the Hedgehog may also refer to:

Sonic the Hedgehog (character), the title character and main protagonist of the franchise

Video games

 Sonic the Hedgehog (1991 video game), a 1991 platform game developed by Sega for the Sega Genesis (Mega Drive) and the first game in the Sonic the Hedgehog franchise.
 Sonic the Hedgehog (8-bit video game), a 1991 platform video game for the Sega Master System and Game Gear
 Sonic the Hedgehog (2006 video game), a 2006 platform video game developed by Sonic Team for the Xbox 360 and PlayStation 3
 SegaSonic the Hedgehog, a 1993 isometric arcade platform game

Printed media

 Sonic the Hedgehog (Archie Comics), comic book series published in the United States by Archie Comics
 Sonic the Hedgehog (IDW Publishing), comic book series published in the United States by IDW Publishing

Film and television
 Sonic the Hedgehog (TV series), a 1993 Italian-American animated television series
 Sonic the Hedgehog (OVA), a 1996 Japanese original video animation series
 Adventures of Sonic the Hedgehog, a 1993 American animated television series
 Sonic the Hedgehog (film), a 2020 action-adventure film

See also

 
 
 Sonic hedgehog, one of three proteins in a mammalian signaling pathway
 Sonic (disambiguation)
 Sonic the Hedgehog 2 (disambiguation)